The Andrew and Mary Stavig House, located at 112 First Avenue, West, in Sisseton, South Dakota, is a Queen Anne-style house built in 1916.  It was listed on the National Register of Historic Places in 1997, by which time it had become the Stavig House Museum.

It is a two-and-a-half-story house built by Scandinavian carpenters Arndt Rice and Hilman Rice.

References

Historic house museums in South Dakota
Houses on the National Register of Historic Places in South Dakota
Queen Anne architecture in South Dakota
Houses completed in 1916
Roberts County, South Dakota